The 1979 Cleveland mayoral election took place on November 6, 1979, to elect the Mayor of Cleveland, Ohio. George Voinovich defeated incumbent mayor Dennis Kucinich. The election was officially nonpartisan, with the top two candidates from the October 2 primary advancing to the general election.

Background

Kucinich had a turbulent mayoralty since he was elected in 1977. He had, in 1978, survived Cleveland's first-ever mayoral recall election.

Primary
As election season approached, Kucinich decided to run again in the mayoral primary. In April, state senator, Charles L. Butts announced that he would enter the race. On July 5, council majority leader, Basil Russo joined the race. Finally, after off-and-on remarks of his candidacy, Republican George Voinovich, who initially supported Kucinich in 1977, decided to give up his position as lieutenant governor of Ohio to run on July 26.

Unlike the 1977 race, however, there were very few debates. The Plain Dealer endorsed Voinovich while The Cleveland Press endorsed Butts. On primary night at Kucinich headquarters, "the band played the theme from Rocky," while Kucinich spoke of the race in the form of a football metaphor: "We are trailing at the half, but what counts is who's winning at the end of the fourth quarter." However, in the primary, the mayor finished second to Voinovich, 47,743 to 36,515 votes. Russo and Butts were eliminated.

General election campaign
Most expected a heated campaign between the two politicians of South Slavic descent (Kucinich being a Croat and Voinovich a Serb). Early in the race, Kucinich jumped on a quote that Voinovich made to The New York Times on August 26: "I like fat cats. I want as many in Cleveland as I can get. Cleveland needs their tax dollars and the jobs they bring." In response, Kucinich stated: "George Voinovich has proven conclusively...–he is the candidate of the fat cats...and he would love to become the mayor of the fat cats so he can repay their generosity." Part of Kucinich's campaign tactics involved distributing political pamphlets throughout the city entitled "Who Owns Voinovich?" The cover illustration depicted three fat cats with Voinovich in front of them with handfuls of money.

However, everything came to a virtual halt when Voinovich's nine-year-old daughter, Molly, was struck by a van and killed. Kucinich could no longer continue his aggressive campaigning against Voinovich. Polls, which were already leaning in Voinovich's favor, now showed overwhelming support for the former lieutenant governor. On November 6, he won the general election with 94,541 votes to 73,755. Of the 33 wards of Cleveland at the time, Kucinich only won eight.

Endorsements

Results

Primary election

General election

References

1970s in Cleveland
Cleveland mayoral
Cleveland
Dennis Kucinich
Mayoral elections in Cleveland
Non-partisan elections
November 1979 events in the United States